The Fantail is a popular breed of fancy pigeon. It is characterised by a fan-shaped tail composed of 30 to 40 feathers, abnormally more than most members of the dove and pigeon family, which usually have 12 to 14 tail feathers. The breed is thought to have originated in Pakistan, India, China, Japan or Spain.  There are several subvarieties, such as the English Fantail, the Indian Fantail, and the Thai Fantail. Charles Darwin used it as one of the examples in the first chapter of his book On the Origin of Species. He believed it was a descendant of the rock dove (Columba livia).

There is a feather mutation called Silky that gives an interesting lace effect to a Fantail's tail feathers. Fantails with this mutation are known as Silky or Lace Fantails.

Fantails are often used by pigeon flyers in the training of racing pigeons and Tipplers. They are used as droppers in that they are placed on the loft landing board as a signal to the flying birds to come in and be fed.

Thai Fantail 

This breed was first introduced by Charles Darwin. They are similar to Indian Fantails, but are pure white and have ribbon-like stripes on their tails. It is difficult to breed outside of Thailand, and few people have done so. A breeder in Pakistan successfully produced striped Thai Fantails by pairing black colored males and brown colored females of different breeds.

See also 
List of pigeon breeds

References

 On Google Print

Domestic pigeons
Pigeon breeds